Blue Diamond Vodka is a brand of grain based vodka distilled in Estonia and imported into the United States by Vodka Brands. The 80-proof vodka is made from rye-grain imported from Finland and its water is sourced from an artesian well.

Reviews
The vodka was awarded "double-gold" in the 2013 San Francisco World Spirits Competition.

References

External links
 

Estonian brands
Estonian vodkas